Rheinmetall Automotive (formerly KSPG and Kolbenschmidt Pierburg) is the Automotive sector of the parent group Rheinmetall. The company emerged in 1997 through the merger of KS Kolbenschmidt GmbH, Neckarsulm, and Pierburg GmbH, Neuss. Hence, at its various traditional locations the company is commonly known as Kolbenschmidt or Pierburg. 40 production plants in Europe, the Americas, Japan, India and China employ a total workforce of around 11,000. Products are developed in cooperation with international auto manufacturers. Rheinmetall Automotive ranks among the 100 biggest auto industry suppliers worldwide and is an important partner to the industry for such products as exhaust gas recirculation systems, secondary-air systems, coolant pumps, and pistons for car gasoline engines and as well as for the commercial vehicle sector.

Divisions 

The company has three divisions:

 "Hardparts" includes business in pistons also for cars and commercial vehicles, large-bore pistons, engine blocks, cylinder heads, as well as other castings, plain bearings, and continuous castings
 "Mechatronics" specializes in emission-reduction modules and assemblies, solenoid valves and actuators, as well as products for trucks and offroaders.  
 "Motorservice" is responsible for global aftermarket business with engine repairers and independent workshops in over 130 countries

Corporate history

Kolbenschmidt 

Karl Schmidt (1876 to 1954), son of NSU- founder Christian Schmidt, established in Heilbronn, Germany, on April 1, 1910, Deutsche Ölfeuerungswerke. Schmidt had served an apprenticeship at NSU in Neckarsulm and at Austin in Birmingham, UK. At NSU he was a senior engineer and authorized signatory. He was awarded a patent for an oil-fired metal-smelting furnace, went on to produce smelting furnaces besides processing aluminum scrap. In 1917, he moved to Neckarsulm where he expanded his enterprise and also manufactured blank pistons for the auto industry. In 1924 and for the repeated expansion of the business Frankfurt-based Metallgesellschaft acquired a majority stake in the company. Its founder Karl Schmidt withdrew in 1927. The production of finished pistons commenced in 1934; in 1937, the Furnace division was sold off. In the course of an air raid in March 1945, the Neckarsulm plant was almost totally destroyed but then rebuilt after the War. Until February 1948, the plant, which was undergoing reconstruction, was confiscated for reparation purposes and up to April 1949 its assets were frozen. In 1951, around 1,100 people were employed at Kolbenschmidt’s Neckarsulm plant and another 500 in Hamburg. The company grew steadily in the 1950s and early 1960s. Growth stagnated slightly during the recession of 1966/67 although with five plants and altogether 5,400 employees, Kolbenschmidt was in 1969 Europe's biggest aluminum caster and market leader among the manufacturers of pistons and bearings. 1972 saw the introduction of NC machinery and starting from 1976 CAD programs. In 1978, annual sales topped DM 500 million. In the 1980s, the company expanded abroad and as a consequence, group sales surged. Late in the 1980s, group sales exceeded DM 1 billion for the first time, reaching DM 1.288 billion in fiscal 1988/89, with non-German sales accounting for 42.1 percent. In 1989, Kolbenschmidt AG had a workforce of 6,389, including 3,412 at the parent plant in Neckarsulm. KSPG AG is still in the immediate vicinity of Audi AG and the two together provide more than one-half of the just under 30,000 jobs at Neckarsulm.

Pierburg 
Bernhard Pierburg (1869 to 1942) founded on March 25, 1909, jointly with his brothers, Heinrich-Hermann and Wilhelm, at Wilmersdorf near Berlin the steel trading enterprise by the name of Gebr. Pierburg oHG. In 1923, this general partnership was transformed into a stock corporation. In 1926 Pierburg acquired the bankrupt Arthur Haendler & Cie., an enterprise that manufactured under license French Solex carburetors. In 1928, Alfred Pierburg (born 1903) developed a proprietary carburetor that was installed in Hanomag vehicles.  Deutsche Vergaser-Gesellschaft (DVG) was formed in 1935, a company that was to operate separately from the steel trading business. 1938 saw the liquidation of Pierburg AG. With the significant defense contracts awarded to DVG, Alfred Pierburg was promoted to the position of Wehrwirtschaftsführer West, in charge of the defense industry in the West and responsible for coordinating arms production in occupied France. In 1945, DVG's production facilities were moved from Berlin to Lausitz where at the close of the War they were confiscated and dismantled. In the postwar years, Pierburg succeeded in setting up a modern company at Neuss and in West Berlin that with the production of carburetors once again grew to a significant size. In the 1970s, the Neuss plant saw one of the first of the wildcat strikes in Germany. Pierburg was taken over by Rheinmetall AG in 1986. 
Kölnischer Kunstverein (Cologne Art Society) displayed for the first time in 2005 the documentation Ihr Kampf ist unser Kampf  (Their Struggle is Our Struggle) on a wildcat strike at Pierburg in 1973. Industrial action by several hundred migrant female workers was to become the paradigm for the industrial conflicts of 1973.

References

External links 
Website Rheinmetall Automotive AG
Website MS Motor Service International GmbH 
Website der MS Motor Service Deutschland GmbH

Companies based in Neckarsulm
Rheinmetall
Automotive companies of Germany
German companies established in 1997
Automotive companies established in 1997